David John David Semerad (born April 25, 1991) is an Australian-born Filipino professional basketball player for the Santa Rosa Laguna Lions of the Pilipinas Super League (PSL). He is also a model and TV host. His twin brother, Anthony, who was his teammate in San Beda is also a professional basketball player for the NLEX Road Warriors.

The Semerad twins were born to a Czech father and Filipina mother from Pampanga and raised in Australia. They both studied at San Beda College, taking up Business Marketing.

College career

The Semerad twins were first recruited by San Beda in 2009.  In their first three years with the Red Lions, the brothers were part of a team that had one Finals appearance, a historical 18-0 season, and two back-to-back championships.

In late 2011, they both left the team due to a falling out with the coaching staff, and opted to play for the Ateneo de Manila University Blue Eagles in the UAAP. Despite having to sit out two seasons before becoming eligible, the twins were actively practicing with the Blue Eagles, and participated in off-season tournaments such as the Father Martin's Summer Cup as part of Ateneo's Team B. After sitting out one season, they decided to go back to San Beda, and sent a reconciliation letter to Rev. Fr. Rector-President Aloysius Maranan for the San Beda Community. With them back in the fold, they won back-to-back titles in NCAA Seasons 89 and 90.

Professional career

Semerad was picked 10th overall by Barako Bull in the 2014 PBA draft. However, he went to San Miguel Beermen after Barako Bull Energy released him immediately after a week.

On December 18, 2018, Semerad was traded, along with Brian Heruela and 2020 1st round pick to TNT Katropa in exchange for Terrence Romeo.

Personal life
Semerad has a son with Gwen Zamora. They were married in France on February 13, 2021.

PBA career statistics

As of the end of 2021 season

Season-by-season averages

|-
| align=left | 
| align="left" rowspan="4" | San Miguel
| 28 || 5.7 || .442 || - || .842 || 1.6 || .1 || .0 || .0 || 1.9
|-
| align=left | 
| 21 || 6.8 || .333 || - || .333 || 1.4 || .1 || .1 || - || .8
|-
| align=left | 
| 13 || 5.5 || .200 || - || .667 || 1.3 || .2 || .1 || - || .6
|-
| align=left | 
| 10 || 4.8 || .222 || - || .500 || 1.6 || - || - || .1 || .6
|-
| align=left | 
| align="left" rowspan="2" | TNT
| 30 || 5.8 || .565 || - || .429 || 1.5 || .2 || .2 || .1 || 1.1
|-
| align=left | 
| 19 || 9.8 || .435 || .250 || .333 || 2.3 || .4 || .4 || .2 || 1.2
|-
| align=left | 
| align="left"| Blackwater
| 5 || 14.4 || .250 || .000 || .500 || 3.4 || .8 || .4 || .6 || 1.0
|-class=sortbottom
| align=center colspan=2 | Career
| 126 || 6.8 || .394 || .167 || .588 || 1.7 || .2 || .2 || .1 || 1.1

Showbiz career

David, with his twin brother, Anthony, are currently managed by Arnold Vegafria's ALV Talent Circuit.  They have since dabbled into hosting, the most recent was with Lucy Torres in TV5's weekly dance show Celebrity Dance Battle in 2014.

Aside from being basketball players, the twins also moonlight as models, endorsing signature brands such as Bench and Sperry.

In 2011, they both entered as houseguests in ABS-CBN reality show Pinoy Big Brother: Unlimited as part of the PBB's Double Trouble twist.  They entered as fake Czech Big Brother Housemates, Antonik and Imerich Novak.

Filmography

Television

References

1991 births
Living people
Australian people of Filipino descent
Australian people of Czech descent
Australian twins
Barako Bull Energy draft picks
Blackwater Bossing players
Centers (basketball)
Citizens of the Philippines through descent
Filipino men's basketball players
Identical twins
Power forwards (basketball)
San Miguel Beermen players
San Beda Red Lions basketball players
TNT Tropang Giga players
Twin sportspeople